Jepetto was a popular band from 1994 to 2004 from Annapolis, Maryland. The band was managed by Adam Wheatley of Funkstarr band's core members, Chris Cosgrove, David Richardson, and Chris Hartman formed Victory Party with Casey Hean, Ben Frock, and Carl Jenson.

Lineup
Chris "Kahz" Cosgrove — vocals
Dan Marcellus — drums
Dave Richardson — vocals, percussion
Chris "FC" Hartman — bass
Jesse Hosch — guitar
Larry Byrne — keyboards

Discography

Albums
12:33 CD / LP (Funkstarr Records, 1999)
Drip — Human — Groove Juice — Smack Doo Doo — Urge — One Way — Generation X — Cheeba — Jesse's Song — Underground — Timbuk — Deciding Where the World Begins — It's About Time

Inkbox CD / LP (Fowl Records, 2002)
Faders — Better Off — Destroyer — Caleco — Dynamite Team — One Way  — Eleven — Faceless — Complications — Old-balls

EPs
Mung Sessions

Compilations
Penthouse on Sunset Vol. 2 CD / LP (2000)

See also
List of HFStival acts
HFStival

External links
Baltimore City Paper profile
Jepetto's Myspace page
Victory Party's Myspace page

Alternative rock groups from Maryland